Cheikh Hamidi (born April 6, 1983 in Saïda) is an Algerian footballer. He currently plays as a forward for MC Saïda in the Algerian Ligue Professionnelle 2.

Hamidi received his first call-up to the Algerian National Team for a friendly against DR Congo on March 26, 2008.

Club career
On July 29, 2011, Hamidi signed a two-year contract with ASO Chlef, joining them on a free transfer from USM Alger.

References

External links
 
 

1983 births
Living people
Algerian footballers
Algeria international footballers
ASO Chlef players
USM Alger players
People from Saïda
Algerian Ligue Professionnelle 1 players
Algeria A' international footballers
USM Annaba players
MC Saïda players
Association football forwards
21st-century Algerian people